In mathematics, a rose or rhodonea curve is a sinusoid specified by either the cosine or sine functions with no phase angle that is plotted in polar coordinates. Rose curves or "rhodonea" were named by the Italian mathematician who studied them, Guido Grandi, between the years 1723 and 1728.

General overview

Specification 
A rose is the set of points in polar coordinates specified by the polar equation

or in Cartesian coordinates using the parametric equations

.

Roses can also be specified using the sine function. Since
.  

General properties 
Roses are directly related to the properties of the sinusoids that specify them.

Petals 
 Graphs of roses are composed of petals. A petal is the shape formed by the graph of a half-cycle of the sinusoid that specifies the rose.
 The shape of each petal is same because the graphs of half-cycles have the same shape. The petal is symmetric about the polar axis.
 Consistent with the rules for plotting points in polar coordinates, a point in a negative half-cycle cannot be plotted at its polar angle because its radial coordinate  is negative.  The point is plotted by adding  radians to the polar angle with a radial coordinate .  Thus, positive and negative half-cycles can be coincident in the graph of a rose. In addition, roses are inscribed in the circle .
When  (or ) the plot of a half-cycle can be seen as spiraling out from the pole in more than one circuit around the pole until plotting reaches the inscribed circle where it spirals back to the pole, intersecting itself and forming one or more loops along the way. Consequently, each petal forms 2 loops when  (or ), 3 loops when  (or ), etc.
 A rose's petals will not intersect each other when the angular frequency  is a non-zero integer; otherwise, petals intersect one another.

Symmetry 
All roses display one or more forms of symmetry due to the underlying symmetric and periodic properties of sinusoids.

 Only certain roses are symmetric about the pole.

 Individual petals are symmetric about the line through the pole and the petal's peak, which reflects the symmetry of the half-cycle of the underlying sinusoid.  Roses composed of a finite number of petals are, by definition, rotationally symmetric since each petal is the same shape with successive petals rotated about the same angle about the pole.

Roses with non-zero integer values of k 

When   is a non-zero integer, the curve will be rose-shaped with  petals if  is even, and  petals when  is odd.  The properties of these roses are a special case of roses with angular frequencies  that are rational numbers discussed in the next section of this article.

 The rose is inscribed in the circle , corresponding to the radial coordinate of all of its peaks.

 When  is even (and non-zero), the rose is composed of  petals, one for each peak in the  interval of polar angles displayed. Each peak corresponds to a point lying on the circle .  Line segments connecting successive peaks will form a regular polygon with an even number of vertices that has its center at the pole and a radius through each peak, and likewise:
 The roses are symmetric about the pole.
 The roses are symmetric about each line through the pole and a peak (through the "middle" a petal) with the polar angle between the peaks of successive petals being  radians. Thus, these roses have rotational symmetry of order .
 The roses are symmetric about each line that bisects the angle between successive peaks, which corresponds to half-cycle boundaries and the apothem of the corresponding polygon.

 When  is odd, the rose is composed of the  petals, one for each crest (or trough) in the  interval of polar angles displayed. Each peak corresponds to a point lying on the circle . These rose's positive and negative half-cycles are coincident, which means  that in graphing them, only the positive half-cycles or only the negative half-cycles need to plotted in order to form the full curve. Line segments connecting successive peaks will form a regular polygon with an odd number of vertices, and likewise:
 The roses are symmetric about each line through the pole and a peak (through the "middle" a petal) with the polar angle between the peaks of successive petals being  radians. Thus, these roses have rotational symmetry of order .

 The rose’s petals do not overlap.

 The roses can be specified by algebraic curves of order  when k is odd, and  when k is even.

The circle 
The circle is the curve's single petal. (See the circle being formed at the end of the next section.)

The quadrifolium 

The trifolium 
The curve is also called the Paquerette de Mélibée. (See the trifolium being formed at the end of the next section.)

Total and petal areas
The total area of a rose with polar equation of the form
, when  is even; and
, when  is odd.

When  is even, there are  petals; and when  is odd, there are  petals, so the area of each petal is
.

Roses with rational number values for k 

Furthermore, the roses are symmetric about the pole for both cosine and sine specifications.

 The rose is inscribed in the circle , corresponding to the radial coordinate of all of its peaks.

The Dürer folium 

The Dürer folium is also a trisectrix, a curve that can be used to trisect angles.

The limaçon trisectrix 
The rose has a single petal with two loops. (See the animation below.)

Roses with irrational number values for k 
A rose curve specified with an irrational number for  has an infinite number of petals and will never complete. For example, the sinusoid  has a period , so, it has a petal in the polar angle interval  with a crest on the polar axis; however there is no other polar angle in the domain of the polar equation that will plot at the coordinates . Overall, roses specified by sinusoids with angular frequencies that are irrational constants form a dense set (i.e., they come arbitrarily close to specifying every point in the disk ).

See also
Quadrifolium – a rose curve where .
Maurer rose
Rose (topology)
Sectrix of Maclaurin
Spirograph

Notes

External links
Applet to create rose with k parameter
 Visual Dictionary of Special Plane Curves Xah Lee
 Interactive example with JSXGraph
 Interactive example with p5

Plane curves
Articles containing video clips